The Cornwall Civic Complex is a business/sports facility located in Cornwall, Ontario, Canada. The arena inside is called the Ed Lumley Arena, named for Ed Lumley. It was built in 1976 and originally held 4,000 people, but in 2008, the arena had an extra 1000 seats added to make the seating 5000. The Complex also has an aquatic centre which was opened in September 2005.

History of the Ed Lumley Arena
The building was once home to several former ice hockey teams including: the Cornwall Royals of the Quebec Major Junior Hockey League and Ontario Hockey League, the Cornwall Aces of the American Hockey League, the Cornwall River Kings of the Ligue Nord-Américaine de Hockey, and the Cornwall Nationals of the Federal Hockey League. In May 2008, the Ed Lumley Arena was host to the Royal Bank Cup.

The Civic Complex has also hosted such concerts as Country legend Charley Pride, Canadian rockers Nickelback, Bryan Adams, and Rush, as well as other Canadian acts Great Big Sea, Celine Dion, Rita MacNeil, Barenaked Ladies, Hedley, Lights, and These Kids Wear Crowns. Legendary rocker Alice Cooper performed at the Cornwall Civic Complex in October 2006.

It has also held many WWE wrestling events and boxing events.

Current and future events at "The Ed"
The complex hosts the Cornwall Colts of the Central Canada Hockey League.

The restaurant/bar inside the Complex
The Complex had a restaurant/bar inside, on the southwest side of the building. The first restaurant was called "The Blue Room" during the days of the Royals. It was then changed to "Resto-Bar Jazzy". After Jazzy closed, it was empty for nearly five years. In 2005, a new sports bar and grill opened up, called Don Cherry's Sports Bar & Grill, a franchise originally owned by former NHL coach and star of Coach's Corner on Hockey Night in Canada, Don Cherry. In April 2009, Don Cherry's was renamed "On Tap Sports Bar & Grill", which has since closed.

References

Cornwall Aces
Cornwall Royals
Buildings and structures in Cornwall, Ontario
Indoor arenas in Ontario
Indoor ice hockey venues in Ontario
Ontario Hockey League arenas
Quebec Major Junior Hockey League arenas
Sports venues in Ontario
Sports venues completed in 1976
1976 establishments in Ontario